Danny Thompson (May 23, 1967) is an American musician from Naperville, IL.  Thompson has been the drummer for the punk rock band Face to Face since 2008.

Career
Danny Thompson joined Face to Face in 2008 when the band reunited since Drummer Pete Parada had already joined The Offspring The year before  Prior to playing with Face to Face, Thompson drummed for Material Issue, The Uprising and Why We Kill. 

He has recently recorded some parts of Alan Parson's new album "From the new world", issued on July 15th, 2022

Business Interests
In addition to drumming in Face to Face, Thompson is the co-owner of Music Factory School of Music in Costa Mesa, CA and runs a line of men's grooming products called Old Ironsides Gentlemen's Care.

Musical Equipment
Thompson uses LTD Classic Maple drums and Sabian cymbals.

Discography
with Face to Face
Laugh Now, Laugh Later (2011)
Three Chords and a Half Truth (2013)
Protection (2016)

References

1967 births
Living people
American rock drummers
Face to Face (punk band) members
20th-century American drummers
American male drummers
20th-century American male musicians